Stephen Kent Bushong (born October 11, 1958) is an American lawyer from Oregon who serves as a justice of the Oregon Supreme Court.

Education 

Bushong received a Bachelor of Arts from the University of Michigan in 1980 and a Juris Doctor from the University of Michigan Law School in 1984.

Career 

From 1984 to 1985 he was a law clerk for Magistrate Judge Marc L. Goldman of the United States District Court for the Eastern District of Michigan. From 1985 to 1993, he was an associate with Miller, Nash, Wiener, Hager & Carlsen in Portland, Oregon. From 1993 to 1994, Bushong was a solo practitioner. From 1994 to 2008 he served as the Oregon Department of Justice; from 1994 to 1998 he was an assistant attorney general for the Trial Division, Special Litigation Unit, from 1998 to 2005 he was the attorney-in-charge, Special Litigation Unit and from 2005 to 2008 he was chief trial counsel. From February 2008 to 2022, Bushong served as a judge of the Multnomah County Circuit Court.

Oregon Supreme Court 

On December 28, 2022, Governor Kate Brown appointed Bushong to serve as a justice of the Oregon Supreme Court to fill the vacancy left by the retirement of Justice Thomas A. Balmer.

References

External links 

1958 births
Living people
Place of birth missing (living people)
20th-century American lawyers
21st-century American judges
21st-century American lawyers
Justices of the Oregon Supreme Court
Oregon lawyers
Oregon state court judges
University of Michigan alumni
University of Michigan Law School alumni